Kadir Koçdemir (born 1964) is a Turkish politician, author and former governor.

Political career
He has served as the Member of Parliament for the
province of Bursa, as part of the Nationalist Movement Party (MHP) since 7 June
2015.

Koçdemir was born in the village of Dündar, located in the Orhaneli district of Bursa, Turkey. He completed his primary level education in Bursa, before going on to undertake secondary education in Arifiye and Gökçeada. In 1985, he graduated from the University of Ankara in the Faculty of
Political Sciences. He went to Germany for Public Administration Internships (1987-1988). After gaining a Jean Monnet scholarship, Koçdemir returned to Germany, where he received his master's degree in European Union and Administrative Law from the Faculty of Law of the University of Hamburg (1991-1992). Later, he received a master's degree in Administrative Structure and Development from the
University of İnönü (1996). He completed his Public Diplomacy Course (1998) and
National Security Academy (1999). Furthering his progress as an academic,
Koçdemir earned his PhD on the subject of the Modern Nation-State and Globalization from the
University of Hacettepe (2004). In addition to this, he was given an honorary
doctorate from the Vector Azerbaijan International Scientific Center (2004).

Koçdemir started work as a district governor candidate of Ağrı in 1985. After this, he went on to work as the district governor of Şebinkarahisar (1988), Eskipazar (1989-1992), Kulp (1992-1994) and Afşin (1994-1996).

He served as a head of department (1996-1998) and assistant general manager (1998-2000) in the General Management of Local
Authorities. Later, he became the governor of Burdur (2000-2003), deputy governor of Eskişehir (2003), governor of Elazığ (2003-2006) and governor of Eskişehir (2011-2013).

Koçdemir began his career in politics as the mayoral candidate for the Nationalist Movement Party (MHP) for Bursa in the 2014 local elections. In the Turkish general election that took place on 7 June 2015, he
was elected into the Grand National Assembly of Turkey as an MP for the province of Bursa. He was then elected once again in the 1 November 2015 general election. He is member of Turkey-EU Joint Parliamentary Committee and the Committee on EU Harmonization.

Personal life 
He is married and has four children, can speak German and English and has published two books: Globalization: Reading Coordinates (2002) and Nation-State and Globalization (2004).

References

1964 births
Turkish political people
Living people
Members of the 25th Parliament of Turkey
Members of the 26th Parliament of Turkey